RTN (Radio Télévision Neuchâtel) is a private French-language radio broadcaster in regional Switzerland. It was founded in 1984.  It broadcasts in the cantons of Neuchâtel, Vaud and a part of the Broye.

Its studios are located in Marin-Epagnier in the canton of Neuchâtel.

External links 
 

French-language radio stations in Switzerland